Qıyıqlı (also, Qıyıxlı, Gyyykhly, and Kyyykhly) is a village and municipality in the Dashkasan Rayon district of Azerbaijan.  It has a population of 340.

References 

Populated places in Dashkasan District